John Paul Pinette (March 23, 1964 – April 5, 2014) was an American stand-up comedian, actor, and Broadway performer. He toured the comedy club circuit beginning in the 1980s and appeared in cinema and on television. Besides stand-up, Pinette did impressions of Michael Jackson, The Chipmunks, Elvis Presley, Gollum from The Lord of the Rings, Hervé Villechaize (Tattoo from Fantasy Island), an Ewok, actor Marlon Brando (notably Brando's role in The Godfather),  as well as various ethnic accents. He occasionally sang in his stand-up routines; for example "Over the Rainbow" from The Wizard of Oz, "Will You Be There" from Free Willy, and "Don't Cry for Me Argentina".

Early life
Pinette was born in Boston, Massachusetts, on March 23, 1964, the son of Robert Pinette Sr. and Louise Pitre (Petrie). His mother was of Acadian ancestry, with both her parents from the Canadian province of New Brunswick. He graduated from Malden Catholic High School in 1982.

He graduated from the University of Massachusetts Lowell in 1986 with a degree in accounting.

Career
He started a six-month career in accounting but, on the advice of friends, left to pursue a career in comedy.

An early break for Pinette was being asked to tour with Frank Sinatra. Pinette was a regular guest on The Tonight Show and The View.

Pinette appeared in the films Duets, Simon Sez, The Last Godfather, Dear God, and Junior. In 2004, Pinette played Bumpo in Artisan Entertainment's The Punisher, starring Thomas Jane and John Travolta.

In 1991, he was a regular cast member on the reality show The Grudge Match as the referee on the series. He was a regular on the series Parker Lewis Can't Lose and, in 1998, played the carjacking victim in the final episode of the sitcom Seinfeld.

Pinette was named Stand-Up Comedian of the Year by the American Comedy Awards in 1999 and received a Gemini Award nomination for his televised performance at Montreal's Just for Laughs Comedy Festival in 2000. At the time of his death, he still held the record for the highest-selling one-person show in the history of Just for Laughs.

In 2004, Pinette joined the touring cast of the musical Hairspray in the role of Edna Turnblad. He later went on to the Broadway production in 2005, and continued in the role until May 28, 2006. In his 2006 concert I'm Starvin, he said it was the first musical theater production he had been in since high school.

In 2004, Pinette's stand-up material was featured in Comedy Central's animated series Shorties Watchin' Shorties. In 2007, Pinette performed at the 42nd annual Jerry Lewis MDA Telethon. He performed at the Edinburgh Comedy Festival in Edinburgh, Scotland, in 2008, and toured in cities in 2010 beginning in April. During this tour, Pinette recorded a Comedy Central special titled John Pinette: Still Hungry. The taping took place at the Vic Theatre in Chicago. The world premiere of Still Hungry was on July 29, 2011, on Comedy Central.

Pinette was a host of the E4 Laughs at Edinburgh podcasts, showcasing comedians from the Edinburgh Festival in 2008.

In 2012, Pinette was one of the comedy acts in Ron White's Comedy Salute to the Troops on CMT.

He was the host of All You Can Eat, a TV series taking a humorous look at American cuisine. The show debuted on the H2 network in the United States in late June 2013.

Death
Pinette died on April 5, 2014, in Pittsburgh, Pennsylvania, at the age of 50. Pinette's personal doctor signed off on his cause of death as pulmonary embolism.

Pinette's funeral services were held near his home in Springfield, Pennsylvania.

Discography
 Show Me the Buffet (CD, 1998)
 I Say Nay Nay (DVD, 2005)
 I'm Starvin'! (DVD, 2006)
 Making Lite of Myself (CD, 2007)
 Still Hungry (DVD/CD, 2011)

Filmography
 ALF - as Howie Anderson in Season 4 Episode 14, "Make 'em Laugh" (1990)
 The Grudge Match (1991) - as himself, the Referee
 Vinnie & Bobby (1992) - as William 'Bill' Melvin Belli
 Revenge of the Nerds III: The Next Generation (1992) - as Trevor Gulf
 Parker Lewis Can't Lose (1993) - as Coach Hank Kohler
 Reckless Kelly (1993) - as Sam Delance
 Junior (1994) - as Clerk
 Revenge of the Nerds IV: Nerds in Love (1994) - as Trevor Gulf
 Hart to Hart: Secrets of the Hart (1995)
 High Tide (1995) - Bob-O DiBella
 Dear God (1996) - as Junior
 Seinfeld (1998) - as Howie in "The Finale"
 Dr. Katz, Professional Therapist (1998) - as John
 Simon Sez (1999) - as Micro
 Duets (2000) - as Finale Singer
 My 5 Wives (2000) - as Stewart
 Do It for Uncle Manny (2002) - as Sammy Levine
 Hairspray (2004-2006) - as Edna Turnblad
 Piece a' Cake (2003) - as Sammy
 The Punisher (2004) - as Bumpo
 The Last Godfather (2010 film) - as Macho
 All You Can Eat (2013 television series) - Host

See also 
 List of stand-up comedians

References

External links

 Official website
 
 

1964 births
2014 deaths
20th-century American comedians
21st-century American comedians
Male actors from Boston
American male comedians
American people of Canadian descent
American stand-up comedians
American male television actors
Deaths from pulmonary embolism
Malden Catholic High School alumni
University of Massachusetts Lowell alumni